Bull's Eye! is an album by pianist Barry Harris recorded in 1968 and released on the Prestige label.

Reception

Allmusic awarded the album 4 stars with its review by Alex Henderson stating, "Harris was always a follower rather than a leader. But again, he's great at what he does, and on Bull's Eye, Harris excels... Die-hard bop enthusiasts can't go wrong with Bull's Eye".

Track listing 
All compositions by Barry Harris except where noted.
 "Bull's Eye" – 7:08  
 "Clockwise" – 4:46  
 "Off Monk" – 9:52  
 "Barengo" – 7:10  
 "Off Minor" (Thelonious Monk) – 4:40  
 "Oh So Basal" – 8:51

Personnel 
Barry Harris – piano
Kenny Dorham – trumpet (tracks 1, 3, 4 & 6)
Charles McPherson – tenor saxophone (tracks 1, 3, 4 & 6)
Pepper Adams – baritone saxophone (tracks 1, 3, 4 & 6)
Paul Chambers – bass
Billy Higgins – drums

References 

Barry Harris albums
1968 albums
Prestige Records albums
Albums produced by Don Schlitten